Kusić may have several meanings in Serbo-Croatian (Bosnian, Croatian, Serbian) usage, either as toponym or last name, found among several South Slavic ethnic groups in Bosnia and Herzegovina, Serbia, Croatia, and Slovenia (formerly Yugoslavia).

Kusić may also refer to:

Places
Kusić, Bela Crkva, a village near Bela Crkva, Serbia
Kusići, Teslić, formerly a sub-village of the village Jezera, Teslić, Bosnia and Herzegovina

People 
 Filip Kusić (born 1996), Serbian-German footballer
 Grgo Kusić (1892–1918), Croat soldier in the Austro-Hungarian Army
 Larry Kusik, award-winning lyricist
 Zvonko Kusić (born 1946), Croatian physician, professor of oncology and nuclear medicine

See also
Kušić, surname